Big ears refer to prominent ears.

Big Ear or Big Ears may refer to:

Books
Big Ears (character), character in the Noddy books by Enid Blyton

Film and TV
Big Ears, 1931 American comedy short in the Our Gang series
"Big Ears", 1955 episode of Our Miss Brooks
Big Ear Tutu, Chinese cartoon television series, or main character Hu Tutu, a young boy with very large ears

Folklore
Big Ears, the name given in Scotland to a demonic cat said to appear during a magical taghairm ritual

Music
Big Ears, pop album by Cevanne Horrocks-Hopayian
"Big Ears", track by Hedley Ward Trio on Melodisc Records
Big Ears Festival, annual music festival in Knoxville, Tennessee

Other
Big Ear, Ohio State University Radio Observatory
"Big Ears", nickname of the European Champion Clubs' Cup